V1298 Tauri is a young (23±4 Myr) weakly-lined T Tauri star that is part of the Taurus-Auriga association in the Taurus Molecular Cloud. Alternatively it is part of a proposed moving group, called Group 29 that is slightly older. The system has four transiting exoplanets, discovered with the Kepler space telescope in the K2 mission. One of the planets was discovered in August 2019 and the other three were discovered in November 2019 by the same team.

Stellar characteristics 

V1298 Tauri has a spectral type of K0 - K1.5 and it has a mass of about 1.1 . The star appears in x-rays from ROSAT data and it does show strong lithium absorption lines, both signatures of youth and therefore it was a proposed member of Taurus-Auriga. On the other hand it does not show signs of accretion and it lacks infrared excess. Instead it shows H-alpha in absorption.

The brightness of V1298 Tauri varies in an unpredictable way between a maximum visual magnitude of 10.31 and a minimum of 10.54.  The light curve of the star shows quasi-periodic variability that was interpreted as stellar rotation and starspots. The light curve also showed several flares.

Based on Gaia DR2 data this star is part of a co-moving pair, together with HD 284154.

Planetary system 
V1298 Tauri has four confirmed planets of which planets c, d and b are near a 1:2:3 resonance (with periods of 8.25, 12.40 and 24.14 days). Planet e only shows a single transit in the K2 light curve and has a period larger than 36 days. Planet e might be in a low-order resonance (of 2:3, 3:5, 1:2, or 1:3) with planet b. The system is very young and might be a precursor of a compact multiplanet system. The 2:3 resonance suggests that some close-in planets may either form in resonances or evolve into them on timescales of less than 10 Myr. The planets in the system have a size between Neptune and Saturn. Only planet b has a size similar to Jupiter.

Models predict that the planets have a minimum core mass of 5  and are surrounded by a thick envelope that make up 20% of their mass. The total mass of planet c and d was predicted to be 2 - 28  and the total mass of planet d and b was predicted to be 9 - 120 . In a follow-up paper the mass of V1298 Tauri b was constrained to <2.2 . The planet c was suspected to be shedding mass due to intense irradiation by the host star, but hydrogen tail existence was refuted by 2021.

Orbits of the planets b and c are nearly coplanar and planet c is not inclined to the equatorial plane of the star, misalignment equals to 2 degrees.

See also 
 List of nearby stellar associations and moving groups
 List of exoplanets discovered in 2019
 Kepler-223 - the first confirmed system with four exoplanets in resonance
 K2-138 - a system with five exoplanets in a 3:2 resonance chain

References 

Planetary systems with four confirmed planets
Pre-main-sequence stars
T Tauri stars
K-type stars
Taurus (constellation)
Irregular variables
Tauri, V1298